Taşçılı is a village in Tarsus district of Mersin Province, Turkey. At  it is situated on the lower slopes of the Toros Mountains. The population of Taşçılı was 745  as of 2011. The village is a Turkmen village. The main economic sectors of the village are agriculture and animal breeding. Grapes, carab, olive and various citrus species are among the crops. Poultry raising as well as ovine and cattle husbandry are other economic activities. 
Taşçılı is one of the villages in which dairying is promoted by the government.

References

Villages in Tarsus District